The 1951–52 Buffalo Bulls men's basketball team represented the University of Buffalo during the 1951–52 NCAA college men's basketball season. The head coach was Malcolm S. Eiken, coaching his sixth season with the Bulls.

Schedule

|-

|-
!colspan=12 style=""| NAIA District Playoffs

References

Buffalo Bulls men's basketball seasons
Buffalo
Buffalo Bulls
Buffalo Bulls